The Men's 1000 metres competition at the 2023 World Single Distances Speed Skating Championships was held on 4 March 2023.

Results
The race was started at 15:14.

References

Men's 1000 metres